Steel Thunder is a 1988 video game published by Accolade. Designed by Tom Loughry, it is labeled an "American Battle Tank Simulation" on the title screen.

Gameplay
Steel Thunder is a game in which modern armored combat is simulated.

Reception
Wyatt Lee reviewed the game for Computer Gaming World, and stated that "Accolade has: 1) paved the way for future tank simulations, 2) proven that the company is serious about developing more than action games, and 3) published a challenging game all in one bold stroke."

Reviews
The Games Machine - Aug, 1989
The One - Jul, 1989
ASM (Aktueller Software Markt) - Sep, 1989
Computer Gaming World - Jun, 1991

References

External links
Review in Compute!
Review in Compute!'s Gazette
Review in Power Play (German)
Review in RUN magazine
Review New Computer Express
Review in Zzap!
Review in Pelit (Finnish)
Article in The Games Machine
Review in Videogame & Computer World (Italian)
Review in Info
Review in Pelit (Finnish)
Review in Commodore Gazette (Italian)

1988 video games
Accolade (company) games
Commodore 64 games
DOS games
Tank simulation video games
Video games developed in the United States
Video games set in Cuba
Video games set in Europe
Windows games